Kostyantyn Frolov (born 20 June 1972) is a retired Ukrainian football defender and current manager who is the director of development of Lyubomyr Stavyshche.

Career
Frolov is a product of SKA Odessa youth sportive school system. His first trainers was Serhiy Krulykovskyi.

After the short football playing career in FC Dynamo Odessa, he retired from football and subsequently graduated Agricultural Institute and Pedagogical Institute. In the same time he began a coaching career. In December 2017 he was appointed a manager of FC Chornomorets Odesa in the Ukrainian Premier League.

References

External links
 
 

1972 births
Living people
Footballers from Odesa
Ukrainian footballers
Ukrainian football managers
FC Dynamo Odesa players
Ukrainian Premier League managers
FC Chornomorets Odesa managers
Ukrainian expatriate football managers
FC Dinamo Batumi managers
Ukrainian expatriate sportspeople in Kazakhstan
Ukrainian expatriate sportspeople in Georgia (country)
Expatriate football managers in Kazakhstan
Expatriate football managers in Georgia (country)
Association football defenders
Ukrainian Second League players
Ukrainian Amateur Football Championship players